Sandwich is a city in DeKalb and Kendall counties in the U.S. state of Illinois. Its population was 7,421 at the 2010 census and 7,221 at the 2020 census.

History

The town's history is tied to politician "Long John" Wentworth and his efforts to move the Illinois border with Wisconsin from being even with the bottom of Lake Michigan to its present location. If those efforts had not been successful, the state line would reside along the LaSalle-DeKalb County border, placing the incorporated community in Wisconsin. The community was established when Almon Gage sought a railroad stop on the Chicago, Burlington and Quincy Railroad that ran through town. Originally naming it Newark Station (not to be confused with the nearby village of Newark) he and Wentworth worked extensively to create the community and also to get the railroad stop created.  In honor of his efforts, Wentworth was given the opportunity to name the town. He named it after his home of Sandwich, New Hampshire. The city's Wentworth Apartments and Wentworth Street are named after him.

Sandwich Fair
Sandwich is the home of the Sandwich Fair, which first started as an annual livestock show in DeKalb County. Originally known as the Union Agricultural Institute, it first opened in 1858. Since 1888, it has been held yearly on the Wednesday through Sunday after Labor Day. It is one of the oldest continuing county fairs in Illinois, drawing daily crowds of more than 100,000, with top attendance days reaching over 200,000. In 2020, the Fair was cancelled for the first time in its history due to the COVID-19 pandemic.

Geography

Features
Within the city limit of Sandwich, there is a network of creeks, which either connect to Somonauk Creek (Lake Holiday), Little Rock Creek, or to the Fox River.  Lake Davis, which stretched from Veterans Memorial Park to what is now Gletty Road, was drained early in the 19th Century to open up additional farmland. The Sandwich town site was built on a natural gradation due to a geological fault line known as the Sandwich Fault, so the city stands on a hillside.  The southeast corner of the city is the lowest spot, roughly near the Harvey Creek Preserve, as well as near Little Rock Creek.  The last earthquake along the Sandwich Fault was on February 10, 2010, with a previous tremor being reported in January 2007.

In the immediate area of Sandwich, there are numerous communities which straddle county borders. Somonauk is split by the LaSalle-DeKalb county line, while the unincorporated community of Welland is split along the border of LaSalle and Lee counties further west; and Millington, Stavanger, and Seneca are also split along the county lines south of Sandwich.

Climate
Sandwich's climate typified by large seasonal temperature variances, with warm to hot (and often humid) summers and cold (sometimes severely cold) winters. The Köppen Climate Classification subtype for this climate is "Dfa". (Hot Summer Continental Climate).

Demographics

As of the census of 2020, there were 7,221 people, 2,548 households, and 1,672 families in the city. The racial makeup of the city was 83.8% White, 1.1% African American, 0.5% Native American, 0.7% Asian, 6.5% from other races, and 7.4% from two or more races. Hispanic or Latino of any race were 14.8% of the population.

There were 2,548 households, out of which 31.4% had children under the age of 18 living with them, 49.0% were married couples living together, 10.7% had a female householder with no husband present, and 34.4% were non-families. 24.4% of all households were made up of individuals, and 10.9% had someone living alone who was 65 years of age or older. The average household size was 2.82 and the average family size was 3.34. In the city, the population was spread out, with 7.9% under the age of 5, 26.4% under the age of 18, and 16.9% who were 65 years of age and over. The median age was 37.2 years. For every 100 females there were 102.1 males.

The median income for a household in the city was $70,563, and median income for a family was $76,452. Males had a median income of $46,429 versus $26,841 for females. The per capita income for the city was $26,619.  5.3% of families and 7.7% of individuals were living below the poverty line, including 8.9% of those under 18 years of age and 2.2% of those 65 years and over.

Education
The community is served by Sandwich Community Unit School District 430, which operates three elementary schools, an intermediate school, a junior high, and a high school. The schools are: Prairie View Elementary, Lynn G. Haskin Elementary, W.W. Woodbury Elementary, Herman E. Dummer School, Sandwich Middle School, and Sandwich High School. Although in past years, CUSD #430 would place some students in out of district schools. The mascot is the Indian, and the school colors are orange and black. Sandwich High School is an active member of the Interstate Eight Conference, and competes in IHSA regulated sports competitions. The high school also has a very competitive wrestling team, and in the 2010, 2011, and 2012 high school football seasons, the teams made it to state playoffs. Sandwich also takes advantage of being in the Waubonsee Community College tax district.

Industry
Sandwich is home to the Sahara-Pak heat-of-compression air dryer, a design patented in 1974 by Henderson Engineering, which is considered by many industry observers to be the most significant development ever made in the design of equipment for drying compressed air. Sandwich has a strong manufacturing history, which is evident by the presence of the Plano Molding Company factory, which makes molded plastic furniture, tackle boxes, organization equipment, and other various items. Sandwich is also home to Meadowvale, Inc., a dairy mix manufacturer that specializes in ice cream, frozen custard, and soft serve mixes that are distributed across the US. Although many factories in the area have been closed down or relocated, the community will continue to be a site of manufacturing for some time to come.

Notable people
Hugh Brannum (1910–1987), vocalist, arranger, composer and actor, who played the role of "Mr. Green Jeans" on the children's television show Captain Kangaroo
Latham Castle (1900-1986), judge and Illinois Attorney General
Garrett Gilkey (1990-), NFL offensive guard, attended school in Sandwich, native of Lemont
Paul Harvey (1882–1955), film and TV actor
Rufus B. von KleinSmid (1875-1964), former Chancellor and President of the University of Southern California

See also
 Sandwich City Hall
 Sandwich Fault Zone
 von KleinSmid Mansion

References

External links

Sandwich Chamber of Commerce

 
1859 establishments in Illinois
Cities in DeKalb County, Illinois
Cities in Illinois
Cities in Kendall County, Illinois
Populated places established in 1859